Lough Mahon is a sea lough in the north-western part of Cork Harbour.

Several Cork suburbs, such as Mahon, Douglas, Rochestown, Blackrock and Ballinlough as well as the town of Passage West are on its southern and western shores. To the north is Little Island and to the east Great Island.

Lough Mahon falls within the Cork Harbour "Special Protection Area", as designated under the EU Birds Directive, and is an important habitat for a number of bird species and migrating waders in particular.

References 

Sea loughs of the Republic of Ireland
Landforms of County Cork
Geography of Cork (city)